Erin Clark (born October 25, 1994) is an American-born distance runner.

Career
In August 2018, Erin Clark moved to Flagstaff, Arizona to train under coach Ben Rosario at Northern Arizona Elite.

NCAA
As a student-athlete for the Colorado Buffaloes, Clark was a 13-time NCAA Division I All-American, 3-time Pac-12 Conference champion and 2-time Mountain Pacific Sports Federation champion. Erin just completed her master's degree in Education and has a bachelor's degree in Biology from CU.

Early life and prep
Clark grew up playing soccer, swim, water polo, and winters participating in downhill ski.

Clark's aunt competed for the Oregon Ducks in track and field and later introduced Erin Clark to track and field in middle school as her co-coach with Erin's mother.

Erin graduated from South Eugene High School as a 2-time OSAA state champion.

South Eugene High School's Erin Clark 4:31.4, Phacelia Cramer 4:56.3, Paige Kouba 4:37.5, Sara Tsai 4:38.7 set a United States high school national record in track and field in the 4 × 1500 m relay in a time of 18:42.33 June 10, 2012 at Portland Track Festival.

In 2013, Clark placed 2nd in the 1500 m (4:30.39) at Oregon School Activities Association 6A state meet after winning the district meet (4:29.42) - Clark placed 1st in the 3000 m (9:32.08) at Oregon School Activities Association 6A state meet after winning the district meet (9:37.91). Clark won 2011 Southwest Conference xc title (18:15).

In 2012, Clark placed 3rd in the 1500 m (4:33.39) and 2nd in the 3000 m (9:51.51) at Oregon School Activities Association 6A state meet.

In 2011, Clark placed 3rd in the 1500 m (4:44.69) and 1st in the 3000 m (10:06.63) at Oregon School Activities Association 6A state meet.

In 2010, Clark placed 12th in the 1500 m (5:00.06) and 10th in the 3000 m (10:41.15) at Oregon School Activities Association 6A state meet.

References

External links
 
 
 NAZ Elite Host Eric Senseman talks with Erin Clark about her transition to joining Northern Arizona Elite, her 13 NCAA National Championship All-American Awards, immediate future in the us championships on the roads and track
 NAZ Elite Erin Clark profile

1994 births
Living people
Colorado Buffaloes women's track and field athletes
Colorado Buffaloes women's cross country runners
Sportspeople from Eugene, Oregon
American female long-distance runners
American female cross country runners
American female steeplechase runners
21st-century American women